The 2016–17 I-League U18 was the ninth season of the Indian I-League U18 and the second season of the competition as an under-18 one. The season began on 15 November with 35 teams divided into eight groups across India. The top 12 teams played in the final group stage in which they were divided into three groups of four and the top team from each group, along with the top second place team, went into the semi-finals, followed by the final. AIFF Elite Academy won the title by defeating East Bengal F.C. in the final.

Teams

First round

Kolkata zone

Maharashtra zone

Shillong–Guwahati zone

Goa zone

Delhi zone

Rest of India – Group A

Rest of India – Group B

Rest of India – Group C

Final round

Final round will feature 12 teams qualified from first round. The teams are drawn into three groups of four teams. Three group winners and one best second placed team enter semifinal.

Groups

Ranking of runner-up teams

Knock–out stage

Bracket

Semi-finals

Final

Statistics

Top Scorers

References

External links
 I-League U18 on the AIFF website.

I-League U18 seasons
2016–17 in Indian football